The Wicklow Senior Hurling Championship is an annual Gaelic Athletic Association competition organised since 1903 by Wicklow GAA among the top hurling clubs in County Wicklow, Ireland. The winner qualifies to represent the county in the Leinster Intermediate Club Hurling Championship, the winner of which progresses to the All-Ireland Intermediate Club Hurling Championship.

The first senior championship was won by Barndarrig in 1923. There was no Wicklow championship in 1938. There are currently seven teams taking part in the Championship:
 Carnew Emmets
 Glenealy
 Avondale
 St Patrick's
 Eire Óg
 Bray Emmets
 Kiltegan

Top winners

Roll of honour

 1903 According to the Wicklow People dated 2/4/1904 this match was played in Annacurra on Sunday 27/3/1904. 
 1915 According to the Wicklow People dated 18/12/1915 this match was played in Annacurra on Sunday 04/12/1915. 
 1937 Although Whitestown (Baltinglass) won on the day they were stripped of the title and suspended for playing illegal players. (result = Evening Herald 1/11/1937, suspension = Nationalist & Leinster Times 11/12/1937)

References

External links
Official Wicklow Website
Wicklow on Hoganstand
Wicklow Club GAA

Hurling competitions in Leinster
Hurling in County Wicklow
Senior hurling county championships
Wicklow GAA club championships